The 1998–99 Liga Alef season was held between 11 September 1998 and 29 May 1999. It was the last season (until 2009–10) in which Liga Alef was the third tier of Israeli football, as the creation of the Israeli Premier League in the summer of 1999 meant that it became the fourth tier.

Due to the restructuring, two clubs were due to be promoted from each division; Hapoel Ra'anana and Hapoel Nazareth Illit from the north and Hapoel Dimona and Hapoel Ramat Gan from the south.

During the summer of 1999, Maccabi Jaffa were demoted to Liga Alef (from Liga Leumit) after their budget was not approved by the Israel Football Association, which resulted in Maccabi Sha'arayim (the third-placed club with the highest points total) being promoted alongside the top two from the South Division. In addition, Hapoel Ashdod, Hapoel Lod and SK Nes Tziona were all demoted from Liga Artzit after their budgets were not approved by the IFA. This resulted in the third- and fourth-placed clubs from the North Division (Hapoel Iksal and Hapoel Acre) and the fourth-placed club in the South Division (Shimshon Tel Aviv) also being promoted.

North Division

South Division

References
Israel Third Level 1998/99 RSSSF

Liga Alef seasons
3
Israel